Carhampton is a village and civil parish in Somerset, England,  to the east of Minehead.

Carhampton civil parish stretches from the Bristol Channel coast inland to Exmoor. The parish has a population of 865 (2011 census).

History
Iron Age occupation of the parish is evident from the remains of Bat's Castle hillfort and associated earthworks. Archaeological excavation in the mid-1990s suggested the existence of early Christian settlement and burial to the east of the village, which had previously been the site of a metalworking settlement.

Carhampton is thought to have been the centre for a Saxon royal estate. The king and his court would locate temporarily to Carhampton as part of a visiting circuit. One function was that officials of the royal court operated from Carhampton to collect taxes from surrounding estates. The village was subjected to Viking raids.

The Anglo-Saxon Chronicle state that, in 836, King Egbert fought the crews of 35 ships at Carhampton. With the Danes in possession of the battlefield, the Chronicle recount a great slaughter.

Carhampton was part of the hundred of Carhampton.

Earl of Carhampton
The title of Earl of Carhampton was created in the Peerage of Ireland in 1785, but became extinct upon the death of the 3rd Earl in 1829. The earls bore the subsidiary titles of Viscount Carhampton (1781) and Baron Irnham (1768), both in the Peerage of Ireland. The Lutrells arrived from Normandy with the Norman conquest of England, acquiring estates as reward for services to the Crown.

Governance

The parish council has responsibility for local issues, including setting an annual precept (local rate) to cover the council's operating costs and producing annual accounts for public scrutiny. The parish council evaluates local planning applications and works with the local police, district council officers, and neighbourhood watch groups on matters of crime, security, and traffic. The parish council's role also includes initiating projects for the maintenance and repair of parish facilities, as well as consulting with the district council on the maintenance, repair, and improvement of highways, drainage, footpaths, public transport, and street cleaning. Conservation matters (including trees and listed buildings) and environmental issues are also the responsibility of the council.

The village falls within the non-metropolitan district of Somerset West and Taunton, which was established on 1 April 2019. It was previously in the district of West Somerset, which was formed on 1 April 1974 under the Local Government Act 1972, and part of Williton Rural District before that. The district council is responsible for local planning and building control, local roads, council housing, environmental health, markets and fairs, refuse collection and recycling, cemeteries and crematoria, leisure services, parks and tourism.

Somerset County Council is responsible for running the largest and most expensive local services such as education, social services, libraries, main roads, public transport, policing and fire services, trading standards, waste disposal and strategic planning.

There is an electoral ward called 'Carhampton and Withycombe'. The ward extends north to the coast at Blue Anchor and south to Rodhuish. The total ward population is 1,158.

It is also part of the Bridgwater and West Somerset represented in the House of Commons of the Parliament of the United Kingdom. It elects one Member of Parliament (MP) by the first past the post system of election, and was part of the South West England constituency of the European Parliament prior to Britain leaving the European Union in January 2020, which elected seven MEPs using the d'Hondt method of party-list proportional representation.

Religious sites

The parish Church of St John the Baptist dates from the Perpendicular period, but was extensively restored, and the north wall rebuilt in 1862–63. The tower was rebuilt between 1868 and 1870 and the vestry was added. It is a Grade I listed building.

Legend
Carhampton is associated with the Arthurian legend of Saint Carantoc.  Carantoc is said to have tamed a dragon, or slain a serpent that was terrorising the inhabitants of Carrum (Carhampton). On victory, Carantoc was granted by Arthur the right to build a monastery in the village.

Wassailing
Carhampton is known for its wassailing celebration which was started in 1930s by the Taunton Cider Company. Wassailing in Carhampton takes place on 17 January in the orchard of the Butcher's Arms pub. This is preceded by a smaller event in the Community Orchard in the centre of the village next to the pub. The villagers form a circle around the largest apple tree, hang pieces of toast soaked in cider in the branches for the robin, who represent the 'good spirits' of the tree. A shotgun is fired overhead to scare away evil spirits.

Carhampton Wassailing Song

Old apple tree, we wassail thee,
And hoping thou wilt bear
For the Lord doth know where we shall be
Till apples come another year.

For to bear well, and to bear well
So merry let us be,
Let every man take off his hat,

And shout to the old apple tree!
Old apple tree, we wassail thee,
And hoping thou wilt bear
Hatfuls, capfuls and three bushel bagfuls
And a little heap under the stairs,
Hip, Hip, Hooray!

Noted People

Gwendolyn Watts - (1937-2000)

See also
Wassail

References

External links

Villages in West Somerset
Civil parishes in Somerset